Paris Misakovich Herouni (December 17, 1933 – December 5, 2008) was a Soviet and Armenian physicist and engineer. He was a member of the Armenian National Academy of Sciences in the fields of radio-physics, radio-engineering, and radio-astronomy and the head of the Antenna Systems chair, which he founded, at the National Polytechnic University of Armenia and Radio Physics Research Institute (RRI). In 1986, he was awarded the USSR State Prize.

Biography
Herouni was born in Yerevan, Armenia, on December 17, 1933. His father was from Hadjin and a survivor of the Armenian genocide.

Upon completion of his undergraduate studies in Yerevan, Herouni attended the Moscow Power Engineering Institute, where he earned his graduate degree in radio technology in 1957. He earned his doctorate of philosophy in radio techniques from the same institution in 1965. Herouni became an associate professor in 1968 and a full professor in 1983.

Because of his many scientific discoveries, Herouni received numerous awards such as: the Order of the Red Banner of Labour, the Silver Medal of Catholicos of All Armenians (given to him by Vazgen I), the State Prize of Soviet Armenia in the field of Science (1985), the Medal "Veteran of Labour", a Bronze Medal from the Ministry of Foreign Affairs of France, and the Lomonosov Gold Medal from the Russian Academy of Sciences.

In addition, Herouni held over 20 patents and published over 340 scientific works, including two monographs during his lifetime.

Scientific works
Herouni's scientific discoveries and theories include his theory and calculations on the Method of the Large Double Mirror Antennas with Fixed Spherical Main Mirror, his theory and equations of electromagnetic field diffraction on the apertures of different configurations. He also developed radio holography—methods of field determination in space by measurements of complex fields near (NF) emitting or scattering objects. In addition, he created methods of Near-to-Far (NF - FF) measurements of antennas and scattering objects parameters. He created the Theory of Field Diffraction in antenna edges when illuminating the part of the main aperture and Antenna Metrology direction.

Among his many experiments are his projected, built, and adjusted equipment which was used for the First Radio-Optical Telescope (ROT-54/2.6)—the Herouni Mirror Radio telescope—the large antenna of which with a diameter  has one of the best parameters among all large antennas in the world. He concluded and built an Antenna Parameters and Phase Shift Angle, being the first 11, based on the World National Primary Standards. The "AREV" Project, which is a new type of powerful and ecologically pure solar power plant. He was the first to come across the powerful radio-flare on the Eta Geminorum star, a red giant and the powerful flares associated with that type of star. He also was the first to measure an aperture of an antenna, in the World Radio Hologram. Using this, he designed and built many highly, effective automatic complexes of equipment for NF - FF antenna measurement.

Rejections of Bing Bang and Cosmic Background Radiation 
The so-called first Radio-Optical Telescope, operated under the supervision of Herouni, measured the Cosmic Microwave Background Radiation as 2.6K which is slightly less than the accepted value of 2.7K. Based on this single measurement, Herouni claimed that " there never was any Big Bang in Universe." This paper entitled 'Measured Parameters of Large Antenna of ROT-54/2.6 Tell about Absence of Big Bang' has only five references, all of which are self-citations.

Armens as the origin of modern humans 
Herouni, a physicist and engineer by educations, made some claims in anthropology and history. Specifically, he claimed that modern humans derived from Armens, a group of people originated from the area of modern Armenia some 12000 years ago. This claim had no scientific evidence of support.

Other research
Later, he turned his attention to megalithic structures, such as Carahunge (sometimes referred to as Zorats Karer) in Armenia. By using four telescopic methods, and the precession laws of Earth, he argued that Zorats Kaher is more than 7,500 years old; dating it to around 5500 BC. According to him, some of the stones mirror the brightest star of the Cygnus constellation—Deneb. Herouni wrote about his claims in his 2004 book, Armenians and Old Armenia. Archaeostronomer Clive Ruggles, writing about the site, stated that, "Inevitably there have been other claims—more speculative and less supportable—relating to the astronomical significance of the site. One is that it can be astronomically dated to the sixth millennium B.C.E. And direct comparisons with Stonehenge, which few now believe was an observatory, are less than helpful."

An overview of ancient astronomy in the Caucasus region briefly discussed Carahunge, citing a preliminary report of a recent survey as evidence that Carahunge indicated astronomical alignments to the Sun, Moon, and selected stars. The authors consider that Carahunge may have been a dual purpose site: a burial place for a significant person and a place for astronomically related ritual. A critical assessment found several problems with the archaeoastronomical interpretations of the site. The northeast avenue, which extends about  meters from the center, has been inconsistently associated with the summer solstice, the major northern lunistice, or the rising of Venus. However, this must remain conjectural as the holes are relatively unweathered and may not even be prehistoric in origin. Herouni had postulated that in order to use the holes in the megaliths for astronomical observations sufficiently precise to determine the date of the solstices, it would have been necessary to restrict the field of vision by inserting a narrow tube into the existing perforations. Without these modifications, for which there is no archaeological evidence, the claimed astronomical significance of the orientations of the holes vanishes. As a consequence, González-Garcia concluded that the archaeoastronomical claims for the site are untenable, although further investigations to determine the astronomical potential of Carahunge and similar sites are merited.

Herouni also worked on the AREV-1 which is a 100 kW solar thermal power plant based on heat absorption of reflected sunbeams and rotating a compressor by the heated air to generate power.

Publications

in English
 Herouni P. M., Theoretical problems of double mirror spherical radio telescopes. Report at the XI General Assembly of Internat. Astronomical Union, San-Francisco, 8 p., USA, 1960.
 Herouni P. M. The First Radio-Optical Telescope. Trans. of the Sixth International Conference on Antennas and Propagation ICAP-89, pp. 540–546, IEEE-URSI, UK, 1989. 
 Herouni P. M. Constructions and Operation of Radio-Optical Telescope ROT-32/54/2,6.- Trans. of the URSI Internat. Meeting of Mirror Antenna Construction, pp. 34–41, Riga, 1990.
 P. M. Herouni About Self Noises of Radio-Optical Telescope ROT- 54/2.6 Antenna, Journal of Applied Electromagnetism, Trans- Black Sea Region Union of Applied Electromagnetism, pages 51–57, Athens, Greece, June 1999.

in Russian
 П. М. Геруни, ”Вопросы расчета сферических двухзеркальных антенн.”-Радиотехника и электроника, т.19, N1, с. 3–12., Москва, 1964.
 П. М. Геруни, ”Пятиметровая сферическая антенна миллиметрового диапазона”- Сб. “Антенны”, вып. 4, с. 3–15, “Связь”, Москва, 1968.
 П. М. Геруни, “Зеркальный радиотелескоп Геруни.” АС N 1377941 от 01.11.87 (приоритет от 02.01.86).

References

External links

Herouni’s telescope, Big Bang Theory, and Ian Gillan’s only question, Mediamax, 2019

1933 births
2008 deaths
Academic staff of the National Polytechnic University of Armenia
Recipients of the Order of the Red Banner of Labour
Recipients of the USSR State Prize
Engineers from Yerevan
Armenian physicists
Soviet engineers
Armenian engineers